The Barbeau House, located at 210 E. Washington Ave. in Lenora, Kansas, is a Queen Anne-style house completed in 1902.  It was listed on the National Register of Historic Places in 2004.

It was home of Joseph and Lillie Barbeau until 1926.  It was deemed notable "a rare example of the Queen Anne style in northwestern Kansas" and for association with pioneer businessman Joseph Barbeau.

References

External links

Houses on the National Register of Historic Places in Kansas
National Register of Historic Places in Norton County, Kansas
Queen Anne architecture in Kansas
Houses completed in 1902
Buildings and structures in Norton County, Kansas